Skaff Elias is a game designer.

Career
Skaff Elias had been working on Magic: The Gathering at Wizards of the Coast when the company was still fairly new. He was one of the designers for various Magic sets, including Arabian Nights (December 1993), Antiquities (March 1994), Legends (June 1994), Fallen Empires (November 1994), and Ice Age (June 1995), Mark Rosewater also credits Skaff Elias with the invention of the Magic Pro Tour.

Elias was responsible for the design work on the Chainmail miniatures game. Elias and Richard Garfield designed an MMORPG based on Dungeons & Dragons, which was never published because Hasbro sold the D&D computer game rights to Infogrames.

He co-authored the D&D manual Miniatures Handbook (2003).

Elias and Garfield also worked on Mind Twist, a free-to-play strategy game from Mind Control Software.

In 2022, Nerdlab Games published Mindbug, a dueling card game designed by Elias, Garfield, Christian Kudahl, and Marvin Hegen.

References

External links
 

American game designers
Dungeons & Dragons game designers
Living people
Place of birth missing (living people)
Year of birth missing (living people)